The steam paddle tug Young Australian was a paddle steamer which was lost on the Roper River in what is now the Northern Territory of Australia.

In 1854, Young Australian was driven ashore at Cape Northumberland in South Australia. It serviced the Roper River in the  Northern Territory  for twenty years before sinking in 1872 while bringing supplies for the overland telegraph work crews at Roper bar.

In 1980, the wreck site was listed on the now-defunct Register of the National Estate.

Young Australian received an Engineering Heritage Marker from Engineers Australia as part of its Engineering Heritage Recognition Program.

References

1853 ships
Paddle steamers of Australia
Maritime incidents in 1854
Maritime incidents in 1872
Shipwrecks of the Northern Territory
Northern Territory places listed on the defunct Register of the National Estate
Recipients of Engineers Australia engineering heritage markers